IQSEC3 is a human gene, known as IQ motif and Sec7 domain 3.

It contains an IQ domain, followed by a SEC7 and then a PH. It functions as an ARF-GEF for the ARF family of GTPases, which is to say that it causes GDP to release, and GTP to bind, thereby activating the ARF protein.

It is highly expressed in the brain, particularly in the amygdala, and is known to have a role in learning.

In a largescale phospho screening of the PSD, it was found to be phosphorylated following activation of the NMDAR complex.

IQSEC3 was originally known as 'KIAA1110', under which name it was found to act as a GEF for Arf1 but not Arf6. It is related to the other Arf-GEF protein IQSEC1.

References 

Genes on human chromosome 12